The Dying Animal (2001) is a short novel by the US writer Philip Roth. It tells the story of senior literature professor David Kepesh, renowned for his literature-themed radio show. Kepesh is finally destroyed by his inability to comprehend emotional commitment. The Dying Animal is the third book in a series portraying the life of the fictional professor, preceded by The Breast (1972) and The Professor of Desire (1977).

Plot summary
Kepesh is fascinated by the beautiful young Consuela Castillo, a student in one of his courses. An erotic liaison is formed between the two; Kepesh becomes obsessively enamored of his lover's breasts, a fetish developed in the previous novels. Despite his fevered devotion to Consuela, the sexually promiscuous professor maintains a concurrent affair with a previous lover, now divorced. He is also reluctant to expose himself to the scrutiny or ridicule that might follow from an introduction to Consuela's family. It is implied that he fears such a meeting would expose the implausible age gap in their relationship. Ultimately, Kepesh limits their relationship to the physical instead of embarking upon any deeper arrangement.

In the end, Kepesh is destroyed by his indecisiveness, the fear of senescence, his lust and jealousy. Consuela never subsequently finds a lover who can show the same level of devotion to her body as Kepesh had. After some years of estrangement, she asks him to take nude photographs of her because she will be losing one of her breasts to a life-saving mastectomy.

Most editions display a cover picture, Le grand nu (1919) by Amedeo Modigliani. In the novel, Consuela sends Kepesh a postcard depicting Le grand nu, and Kepesh surmises that the figure in the painting is her alter ego.

Film adaptation
The Isabel Coixet film Elegy (starring Penélope Cruz and Ben Kingsley), which premiered at the 2008 Berlinale, is based on The Dying Animal.

References

Further reading 
Hanft, Lucas, "The Animal in Man Roth returns to introspection and the Id. The Dying Animal", Yale Review of Books, Fall 2001 issue
Mars-Jones, Adam, "The sexual licence fee: Philip Roth's narrative drive suffers in this coda to his great works, The Dying Animal", The Observer (UK), Sunday July 1, 2001 
Scott, A.O., "Alter Alter Ego: Philip Roth brings back David Kepesh, formerly a breast", New York Times, May 27, 2001.

External links 
Summary and Questions for Discussion

Novels by Philip Roth
2001 American novels
American novels adapted into films